Pomaderris precaria is a species of flowering plant in the family Rhamnaceae and is endemic to New South Wales. It is a slender shrub with hairy new growth, elliptic to lance-shaped leaves with the narrower end towards the base, and panicles of cream-coloured flowers.

Description
The upper surface of the leaves is covered with soft, more or less velvety hairs and the lower surface is covered with woolly, yellowish to whitish hairs.

Taxonomy
Pomaderris precaria was first formally described in 1997 by Neville Grant Walsh and Fiona Coates in the journal Muelleria from specimens Walsh collected near the Rylstone-Bylong road in 1994. The specific epithet (precaria) means "precarious", referring to the roadside distribution of the type population.

Distribution and habitat

References

Flora of New South Wales
precaria
Plants described in 1997
Taxa named by Neville Grant Walsh